Lamont Paris (born November 11, 1974) is an American college basketball coach and is currently the head coach for the South Carolina Gamecocks.

Playing career
Paris played college basketball at The College of Wooster, Ohio, where he was captain for his junior and senior seasons while also being a two-time All-North Coast Athletic Conference selection.

Coaching career
After beginning his coaching career as an assistant at his alma mater during the 1997-98 season, Paris moved on to assistant coaching stints at DePauw and IUP before landing on Keith Dambrot's staff at Akron where he stayed for five seasons. Paris then joined Bo Ryan's staff at Wisconsin in 2010, and was a part of two Sweet 16 squads and the Badgers' Final Four and national championship game appearances during the 2013–14 and 2014-15 seasons. When Ryan stepped down, Paris was elevated to associate head coach under Greg Gard when Gard was given the job on a permanent basis.

Chattanooga
On April 4, 2017, Paris was introduced as the 20th head coach in Chattanooga history, replacing Matt McCall who left to become the head coach at Massachusetts. During the 2021–22 season, Paris led the Mocs to a 27–8 record and the Southern Conference regular season and tournament championships. In the NCAA Tournament, 13th seeded Chattanooga narrowly lost to Illinois 54-53.

South Carolina
On March 22, 2022, Paris was officially announced as head basketball coach at South Carolina, becoming the first African-American to lead the Gamecocks' men's basketball program. He signed a five year deal with the program and replaced Frank Martin.

Head coaching record

References

Living people
Akron Zips men's basketball coaches
American men's basketball coaches
American men's basketball players
Basketball coaches from Ohio
Basketball players from Ohio
Chattanooga Mocs men's basketball coaches
College men's basketball head coaches in the United States
DePauw Tigers men's basketball coaches
IUP Crimson Hawks men's basketball coaches
People from Findlay, Ohio
South Carolina Gamecocks men's basketball coaches
Wisconsin Badgers men's basketball coaches
Wooster Fighting Scots men's basketball coaches
Wooster Fighting Scots men's basketball players
1974 births